Ophiomyia camarae is a fly native to the Caribbean, Mexico, Central America and Florida but has been introduced as biological control agent to many countries outside of the Americas as biological control agent of Lantana camara.
The adult have a size of 1.5–2 mm are shiny, black with red compound eyes.

Biology
This fly mines the leaves of Lantana camara.

References

Agromyzidae
Diptera used as pest control agents
Insects of Central America